Devapathiraja College is a Sri Lankan educational establishment situated in the coastal town of Rathgama. It is the first free Buddhist English school in the Southern Region. It was founded in 1920 by Philanthropist Sir Ernest de Silva. It was damaged by a tsunami in 2004 and relocated to the country, 1.5km away from the coastline.

Number of Students: There are currently 2007 students in Devapathiraja College 

https://locator.eduportalbd.com/global/lk/details.php?ins=6318

Provincial schools in Sri Lanka
Schools in Galle District